Heterostomus is a genus of flies in the family Xylophagidae.

Some authors have placed it in is own family: Heterostomidae. Woodley 2011 States that because its larvae are unknown, its family placement within Xylophagidae remains uncertain.

Distribution
Chile.

Species
Heterostomus curvipalpis Bigot, 1857

References

Xylophagidae
Brachycera genera
Taxa named by Jacques-Marie-Frangile Bigot
Diptera of South America
Endemic fauna of Chile